South Central China, South-Central China or Central-South China, is a region of the People's Republic of China defined by State Council that includes the provinces of Guangdong, Hainan, Henan, Hubei and Hunan, as well as the Guangxi Zhuang Autonomous Region; in addition, the two provincial-level special administrative regions (SARs), Hong Kong and Macau, are also included under South Central China.

South Central China can be further divided into South China and Central China regions due to difference in civilian customs and geographic location.

Administrative divisions

Cities with urban area over one million in population 
Provincial capitals in bold.

See also 

 Regions of China
 Central China
 South China
 East China
 Northeast China
 Southwest China
 Northwest China

Notes

References

External links 

Regions of China